Lachesilla is the main genus in the psocopteran family Lachesillidae. There are at least 310 described species in Lachesilla. Frequent species in the Northern hemisphere include Lachesilla quercus and  Lachesilla pedicularia. Some species are localized: Lachesilla merzi has been collected only once in Spain and Lachesilla rossica, apart from the original specimens that were found in southern Russia, is only known from the Valley of the Allondon river, near Geneva, Switzerland.

See also
 List of Lachesilla species

References

Lachesillidae
Psocomorpha genera